Svetlana Davidovna Kasyan (born 24 July 1984) is a Russian-Kurdish operatic soprano.

Early life and training

Svetlana Kasyan was born in a Yezidi Kurdish family on 24 July 1984 in Batumi, Georgian SSR, USSR. In 1993 she moved from Batumi to Aktobe, where she studied at school number 26.

After in 2006 she entered the music college. Then she studied at the Tchaikovsky Moscow State Conservatory in the class of Galina Pisarenko. She also perfected vocal technique with Dmitry Vdovin and in Washington with Placido Domingo.

From 2009 to 2011 - a member of the youth program of the Bolshoi Theatre.

Career
In 2010 she debuted on the Bolshoi Theatre stage in the Kupava party in “The Snow Maiden” opera by Rimsky-Korsakov, and later performed therein “The Love for Three Oranges” by S. Prokofiev and “The Enchantress” by Pyotr Ilyich Tchaikovsky.

In 2011, she performed the title role in the opera Tosca by Giacomo Puccini at the Yekaterinburg Opera and Ballet Theater, and in the same year at the Bolshoi Theatre. Journalists called her "the most promising voice of the world".

In Italy, she debuted in 2011 at Bari in Beethoven’s Symphony No. 9.

In the anniversary issue of the men's magazine “Maxim” in April 2017, she starred in an erotic photo shoot to “attract the attention of the public to the opera art”.

On 17 December 2021, Svetlana Kasyan released her first album called Fratelli Tutti, which she dedicated to Pope Francis for his 85th birthday. The album is made of 14 songs in 14 different languages.

References

External links

 Corriere Della Sera: "Svetlana Kasyan: «Io come la Callas? Non sarò mai Gilda del Rigoletto»"
 Roma Today: „Le "prime donne" della lirica al Teatro Palladium“

1984 births
Living people
People from Batumi
Russian operatic sopranos
Moscow Conservatory alumni
21st-century Russian women opera singers
Kurdish singers